The Early Bird Jenny is an American homebuilt aircraft that was designed by Dennis Wiley and produced by the Early Bird Aircraft Company of Erie, Colorado, also by Leading Edge Airfoils of Peyton, Colorado. When it was available the aircraft was supplied as a kit and also in the form of plans for amateur construction.

Design and development
The aircraft is a 67% scale replica of the First World War Curtiss JN-4 Jenny. It features a strut-braced biplane layout, a two-seats-in-tandem open cockpit, fixed conventional landing gear and a single engine in tractor configuration.

At the time the kit was first made available the aircraft could be constructed as a US FAR 103 Ultralight Vehicles exemption two-seat trainer or as an amateur-built aircraft.

The Jenny is made from a mix of steel and aluminum tubing, with some wooden parts and its flying surfaces covered with doped aircraft fabric.

The supplied kit included the Rotax 503 engine. The manufacturer estimated the aircraft's construction time from the kit to be 500 hours.

Operational history
By 1998 the company reported that 53 kits had been sold and 24 aircraft were flying.

Specifications (Jenny)

References

External links

Jenny
1990s United States sport aircraft
1990s United States ultralight aircraft
Single-engined tractor aircraft
Biplanes
Homebuilt aircraft
Leading Edge Air Foils aircraft
Replica aircraft